David Parker (born 1951) is an American sound engineer. He won two Academy Awards for Best Sound and was nominated for another five in the same category. He has worked on more than 180 films since 1980.

Selected filmography
Parker won two Academy Awards for Best Sound and was nominated for another five:

Won
 The English Patient (1996)
 The Bourne Ultimatum (2007)

Nominated
 Never Cry Wolf (1983)
 Pirates of the Caribbean: The Curse of the Black Pearl (2003)
 The Curious Case of Benjamin Button (2008)
 The Social Network (2010)
 The Girl with the Dragon Tattoo (2011)
 Rogue One (2016)
 Star Wars: The Last Jedi (2017)

References

External links

1951 births
Living people
American audio engineers
Best Sound Mixing Academy Award winners
Best Sound BAFTA Award winners